(The) Glass Slipper may refer to

 The folk tale "Cinderella", also known as "The Little Glass Slipper"
 Glass Slipper (dragster), a streamliner dragster
 Glass Slipper Project, a charitable prom organization U.S.
 The Glass Slipper (film), an American musical film
 The Glass Slipper (novel), an American mystery novel

See also
Glass Slippers, an South Korean drama series
Glass Slippers (horse), a British Thoroughbred racehorse